Sandford House and Norbury House are grade II listed buildings on The Green, Southgate, London. The houses date from the late eighteenth century with later additions.

See also
40 The Green, Southgate

References

External links

Grade II listed buildings in the London Borough of Enfield
Southgate, London
Houses in the London Borough of Enfield
Grade II listed houses in London